The Zimbabwe Council of Churches is an ecumenical Christian organization in Zimbabwe. It was founded in 1964 and is a member of the World Council of Churches and the Fellowship of Christian Councils in Southern Africa.

External links  
 
World Council of Churches listing

Christian organizations established in 1964
Members of the World Council of Churches
Christian organizations based in Africa
Christianity in Zimbabwe
National councils of churches